The 14th Saturn Awards, honoring the best in science fiction, fantasy and horror film in 1986, were held on May 17, 1987.

Winners and nominees
Below is a complete list of nominees and winners. Winners are highlighted in bold.

Film awards

Special awards

George Pal Memorial Award
 Arnold Leibovit

Life Career Award
 Leonard Nimoy

President's Award
 Joseph Stefano
 Marshall Brickman – The Manhattan Project

References

External links
 The Official Saturn Awards Site

Saturn
Saturn Awards ceremonies
Saturn